Tiruppukkozhiyur (also called Karunaiyaaththaal Temple, Avinasilingeswarar temple and Avainasiappar temple) is a Hindu temple dedicated to the deity Shiva, located in Avinasi, a panchayat town in Tiruppur district in the South Indian state of Tamil Nadu. Shiva is worshipped as Avinasiappar, and is represented by the lingam. His consort Parvati is depicted as Karunambigai. The presiding deity is revered in the 7th century Tamil Saiva canonical work, the Tevaram, written by Tamil saint poets known as the Nayanars and classified as Paadal Petra Sthalam.

The temple complex covers five acres and it houses two gateway towers known as gopurams, each facing the Avinasiappar and Karunambigai shrine. The temple has a number of shrines, with those of Avinasiappar and his consort Karunambigai being the most prominent.

The temple has six daily rituals at various times from 6:00 a.m. to 8:30 p.m., and four yearly festivals on its calendar. The Brahmotsavam festival is celebrated during the day of the Magam (February - March) is the most prominent festival.

The original complex is believed to have been built by Cholas, while the present masonry structure was built during the Nayak during the 16th century. In modern times, the temple is maintained and administered by the Hindu Religious and Charitable Endowments Department of the Government of Tamil Nadu.

Legend

Avinasi indicates the one that cannot be destroyed indicating Shiva's grace to his devotees. As per Hindu legend, two boys of eight years of age took a dip in a tank when a crocodile swallowed one of them. The mother of the boy pleaded Sundarar to rescue his child and said that she was planning to do Upanayanam (sacred thread ceremony) to the child when this incident happened. Sundarar, who was on his way to Tiruvanchikulam heard the incident and sung praises of Shiva in the temple. The boy was miraculously rescued from the clutches of a crocodile and  this event is commemorated during the Mudalai Vaai Pillai Utsavam on Panguni Uththiram. There is a shrine to Sundarar on the banks of the temple tank and the bottom of the flagpost carries the image of the legend. Since the boy came out of crocodile's mouth, the place is called Pukkoliyur. Brahma is said to have worshipped the Shiva here for hundred years. The elephant of Indiran, Iravadham is said to have worshipped at this temple for twelve years.

Architecture

This temple is situated 40 km from Coimbatore and about 14 km from Tirupur. The nearest railway station is at Tiruppur and the nearest airport is Coimbatore International Airport. The main rajagopuram is on the east side with seven tiers and is over 100 ft tall. Inside there are two corridors. At the main entrance, the sculptures of Narthana Ganapathy can be found on both the sides. Once we enter, there is a mandapam and the sculptures of Veerabadhirar, Oorthava Thandavar, Kaali can be seen on the pillars of the mandapam. The main shrine is for Lord Shiva known as Avinasiappar and the Ambal his consort is known Karunambikai . Ambal's sanctum is to the right of Avinasiappar's sanctum, unlike that in most temples. The mandapam in front of Ambal's sanctum has interesting sculptural work. The pathways on the four sides of the sanctum sanctorum are decorated with the images of Nayanmars, Murugan Sannadhi in the northwest and Karaiakal Ammaiar Sannadhi on the northeast. The large Nandi here and the carved image of a scorpion in the Ambal sanctum are of significance here. Several other carvings here deserve attention. Avinashiappar temple is a protected monument under the Archaeological Survey of India. The Theertham here is a well, called as Kasi Gangai Theertham. The sthala Vrisham is Paatiri. There is a shrine for Kaalabhairavar and is being worshipped here with the offerings of Vadai Maalai.

Religious importance
It is one of the shrines of the 275 Paadal Petra Sthalams - Shiva Sthalams glorified in the early medieval Tevaram poems by Tamil Saivite Nayanar Sundarar. The temple also finds mention in Tirumular's Thirumantiram, Arunagirinathar's Tiruppugazh and Manikkavacakar's Tiruvasakam.

Festivals
The temple priests perform the puja (rituals) during festivals and on a daily basis. The temple rituals are performed six times a day; Kalasanthi at 6:00 a.m., Irandam Kalm at 9:00 a.m., Uchikalam at 12:00 a.m., Sayarakshai at 6:00 p.m,  Irandam Kalm at 7:30 p.m., and Arthajamam at 9:00 p.m.. Each ritual comprises four steps: abhisheka (sacred bath), alangaram (decoration), naivethanam (food offering) and deepa aradanai (waving of lamps) for Edaganathar and Elavrkuzhali. Sundarar's miracle is celebrated every year as Mudalai Vaai Pillai Utsavam during Panguni Uththiram during the Tamil month of Panguni. The Car festival attracts large crowd and the festival car here is said to be on par with Tiruvarur. The procession of the 63 Nayanmars (Arupathi Moovar Ula) is another important festival celebrated here. Other festivals include Vinayaka Chaturthi, Aadi Pooram, Navaratri, Aippasi Pournami, Skanda Sashti, Kartikai Deepam, Arudra Darisanam, Tai Poosam, Maasi Magam, Panguni Uththiram and Vaikasi Visakam.

References

External links

 http://www.templenet.com/Tamilnadu/s012.html
 http://www.shivatemples.com/knaadu/kn6.html

Photogallery

Hindu temples in Karur district
Padal Petra Stalam